Svobodnoye is a rural locality (a selo) in Kasatkinsky Selsoviet of Arkharinsky District, Amur Oblast, Russia. The population was 4 as of 2018. There is 1 street.

Geography 
Svobodnoye is located near the left bank of the Bureya River, 67 km northwest of Arkhara (the district's administrative centre) by road. Ukrainka is the nearest rural locality.

References 

Rural localities in Arkharinsky District